The Plumpungan Inscription is a stone monolith carving which was found in the area of Salatiga, a small town in Central Java in Indonesia.

The monolith is located about 4 km from Salatiga township, towards Beringin village.

Inscriptions

Official Translation (Indonesian)

Unofficial English translation

 Be happy ! All the Peoples ! The Saka year is 672/4/31 (24 July 760 AD) on Friday
 mid day
 From Him, for the faith, for the congregation to the Almighty, has given a land or park, for their prosperity
 which is the village of Hampra, located in the vicinity of Trigramyama (Salatiga) with the blessing of Siddhewi (the goddess who is perfect or late) as a tax-free are, or perdikan
 noted with writing or monolith which uses the tip of palm
 from Him who is called Bhanu. (and them) with this sacred building or temple. Always find eternal life

References

External links

 Monolith of Plumpungan in Google Maps

Archaeological sites in Indonesia
Sanskrit inscriptions in Indonesia
Central Java